The 1951 SEC men's basketball tournament took place March 1–3, 1951 in Louisville, Kentucky at the Jefferson County Armory.

The  won the tournament championship game by beating the Kentucky Wildcats, 61–57. The Commodores season came to a close after the win, while Kentucky would go on to win the 16-team 1951 NCAA tournament.

Bracket

 = denotes overtime game

References

SEC men's basketball tournament
1950–51 Southeastern Conference men's basketball season
Basketball in Kentucky
SEC Basket